Quentin Kenihan (27 February 1975 – 6 October 2018) was an Australian disability advocate, writer and actor. He was born with osteogenesis imperfecta, a rare bone disease.

Kenihan was born in Box Hill, Victoria, in 1975 and first came to the attention of the public aged seven when he was the feature of a documentary by Australian journalist Mike Willesee. He later was the host of a Ten Network television show Quentin Crashes. In 2016, Kenihan participated in a lengthy television interview with Ray Martin.

He appeared in the 2015 film Mad Max: Fury Road in the role of Corpus Colossus.
Kenihan died in Adelaide on 6 October 2018. His suspected cause of death was an asthma attack.

Politics
At the time of his death, Kenihan had nominated to stand as a councillor for the City of Adelaide elections on 9 November 2018. His name appeared on the ballot paper, but votes for him were not counted and were allocated to the next-preferenced candidate. The Quentin Kenihan Inclusive Playspace will be a disability-accessible playground built in his memory in Rymill Park.

Filmography

Film

Published works

References

External links
Official website archived from the original (Dead Link)
Tribute by Casey Neistat

1975 births
2018 deaths
Australian disability rights activists
Male actors from Adelaide
People with osteogenesis imperfecta
21st-century Australian male actors
Australian male film actors
Actors with disabilities